HIP 41378 is a star located 346 light-years away in the constellation of Cancer. The star has an apparent magnitude of 8.92.

Planetary system 
In 2016, the K2 Kepler mission discovered five planets around HIP 41378, with sizes ranging from 2 times the size of Earth to the size of Jupiter, out to about 1 AU for the outermost planet. The semi-major axes were not known until K2 Haute-Provence Observatory radial velocity data was obtained in 2019. Also, a sixth non-transiting planet, HIP 41378 g, was discovered, along with speculation that additional planets may exist between HIP 41378 g and HIP 41378 d. The planet HIP 41378 f was also found to likely have optically-thick rings or a highly extended atmosphere.

See also 
 Planetary system

References 

 
F-type main-sequence stars
2016 in space
Planetary systems with five confirmed planets
041378
Durchmusterung objects
Cancer (constellation)